Naumče Mojsovski (born 17 June 1980) is a former Macedonian handball player.

References

1980 births
Living people
Sportspeople from Struga
Macedonian male handball players
Macedonian expatriate sportspeople in Qatar
Macedonian expatriate sportspeople in Romania
Macedonian expatriate sportspeople in Spain
Expatriate handball players
Liga ASOBAL players